Pampero may refer to:

 El Pampero, first balloon flown by the Argentine aviator Jorge Newbery in the 1910s
 Industrias Pampero, C.A., rum distillery in Venezuela
 Licoreros de Pampero, Venezuelan professional baseball club
 Pampero, a fictional ship from the BBC television drama series The Onedin Line
 Pampero Firpo, surname of Juan Kachmanian, a retired Argentine professional wrestler
 Pampero (multiple rocket launcher), an Argentinian multiple rocket launcher
 Pampero, a southeastern wind in the South American pampas
 Pampero Ropa de Trabajo, an Argentine brand of work clothing and footwear, currently owned by Grupo Cardon.